Mazhalai Pattalam is a 1980 Indian Tamil-language children's film simultaneously filmed in Kannada as Makkala Sainya. The directorial debut of Lakshmi, it stars Vishnuvardhan and Sumithra. The story is based on the 1968 film Yours, Mine and Ours. Mazhalai Pattalam was released on 9 May 1980, and Makkala Sainya on 21 July that year.

Plot 

The love story of the hero, taking care of his now-orphaned brother's children and the heroine, taking care of her now-orphaned sister's children. The children, who are always at loggerheads, makes their marriage an impossibility until they are forced to join forces.

Cast 
 Vishnuvardhan as Shivaraman alias Gowri Manohari
 Sumithra as Uma

Production 
The film, announced in 1979, is the directorial debut of Lakshmi, who was supervised by K. Balachander. The story is based on the 1968 film Yours, Mine and Ours.

Soundtrack 
The soundtrack was composed by M. S. Viswanathan. The song "Gowri Manohari" is based on Gourimanohari raga. The song was named after Gowri Manohar, a character from the film.

Release and reception 
Mazhalai Pattalam was released on 9 May 1980, and Makkala Sainya on 21 July that year. Kanthan of Kalki wrote that Lakshmi's direction in her debut did not speak; however her experienced maturity was evident.

References

External links 
 
 
 

1980 directorial debut films
1980 films
1980 multilingual films
1980s children's films
1980s Kannada-language films
1980s Tamil-language films
Films scored by M. S. Viswanathan
Indian children's films
Indian multilingual films